was a Japanese samurai of the late Edo period who served as the lord of Tatebayashi han (Kōzuke Province). Succeeding to family headship in 1864, he ruled the domain during the closing stages of the Tokugawa Shogunate and the chaos of the Boshin War. He and his domain were deeply involved in the events of the war in the north.

In the Meiji era, Hirotomo's family became  in the new nobility.

External links
Biographical information and picture 
More information 

1848 births
1883 deaths
Kazoku
Meiji Restoration
Samurai
Fudai daimyo